Ola is an unincorporated community in Kaufman County, located in the U.S. state of Texas. According to the Handbook of Texas, the community had a population of 50 in 2000. It is located within the Dallas/Fort Worth Metroplex.

History
The area in what is known as Ola today was first settled in the late 19th century. A post office was established at Ola in 1892 and remained in operation until 1911. There were several businesses in Ola in 1896. The population of the community was reported as 72 in 1900, which dropped to 30 in 1910, and returned to 72 from 1930 to the mid-1960s. There were two businesses between 1930 and 1940, only one in 1945, and none thereafter. Its population was 50 from 1970 through 2000.

Geography

Education
Ola is served by the Kaufman Independent School District.

References

Unincorporated communities in Kaufman County, Texas
Unincorporated communities in Texas